Double or nothing in gambling, is to repeat the same bet with the same wager.

Double or Nothing may also refer to:

Films
 Double or Nothing (1936 film), a 1936 short film released by Warner Brothers
 Double or Nothing (1937 film), a 1937 musical feature film released by Paramount Pictures
 Double or Nothing (1940 film), a 1940 short film released by Warners with theme similar to 1936 film

Books
 Double or Nothing (Federman novel), a novel by Raymond Federman published in 1971
 Double or Nothing, a 2000 novel by Dennis Foon
 Double or Nothing, a 2008 autobiography by Thomas Breitling
 Double or Nothing (James Bond), a James Bond novel by Kim Sherwood published in 2022.

Television and radio
 "Double or Nothing" (Angel), a 2002 episode of the television series Angel
 Double or Nothing (radio show), a radio game show which aired from 1940 to 1954

Music
 Double or Nothing (Big Sean and Metro Boomin album), 2017
 Double or Nothing (Erick Sermon album), 1995
 Double or Nothing (Lani Hall album), 1979
 Double or Nothing (Leaether Strip album), 1995
 "Double or Nothing", a song by B.o.B and Big Boi from the album Army of Two: The Devil's Cartel
 "Double or Nothing", a song by Booker T. & the M.G.'s from the album Hip Hug-Her

Other uses
AEW Double or Nothing, an annual professional wrestling event by All Elite Wrestling (AEW)